Wolf River Township is a township in Doniphan County, Kansas, USA.  As of the 2000 census, its population was 439.

History
Wolf River Township was organized in 1855.

Geography
According to the USGS, it contains four cemeteries: Bitner, Burl, Oak Hill and Wolf River.

The streams of Charlie Creek, Cold Ryan Branch, Halling Creek, Kenney Creek, Nelson Creek, Rittenhouse Branch, Springs Branch and Squaw Creek run through this township.

Transportation
Wolf River Township contains one airport or landing strip, Rush Airport.

References

 USGS Geographic Names Information System (GNIS)

External links
 US-Counties.com
 City-Data.com

Townships in Doniphan County, Kansas
Townships in Kansas
1855 establishments in Kansas Territory